Robert Read Masters (19 October 1900 – 24 August 1967) was a New Zealand rugby union player and administrator. A lock, Masters represented  at a provincial level, and was a member of the New Zealand national side, the All Blacks, from 1923 to 1925. He played 31 matches for the All Blacks including four internationals, scoring six tries in all.

After retiring as a player, Masters gave long service as an administrator. He was a member of the executive of the Canterbury Rugby Union from 1931 to 1955, serving as president between 1950 and 1952. He was president of the New Zealand Rugby Football Union in 1955. Masters was a Canterbury selector from 1928 to 1931, a South Island selector from 1928 to 1939 and 1947 to 1950, and an All Blacks selector in 1949. Between 1935 and 1967, Masters was an editor of the New Zealand Rugby Almanack with Arthur Carman and Arthur Swan.

References

1900 births
1967 deaths
Canterbury rugby union players
New Zealand international rugby union players
New Zealand Rugby Football Union officials
New Zealand rugby union players
New Zealand sports executives and administrators
Rugby union locks
Rugby union players from Picton, New Zealand